Echinus tylodes is a species of sea urchin in the Echinidae family. It is white with rather sparse pink spines, and is endemic to the eastern coast of North America including the Gulf of Mexico.

Description
The joints between the ambulacral plates and the pores through which the tube feet project are both sunken below the general surface of the test. The tubercles to which the primary spines are attached are slightly raised, making it appear as if they are on vertical ridges. The primary spines are short and stout, and the test is easily visible as few secondary spines occur. The general colour of this urchin is white and it has pink spines.

Distribution and habitat
Echinus tylodes is found on the East Coast of the United States from Cape Cod southwards to the Straits of Florida and in the Gulf of Mexico. It is often found around deepwater corals, sitting on the coral branches or around coral mounds among the remains of dead corals.

Biology
Most deepwater echinoderms feed on algal debris and detritus. Examination of the gut contents of this species also showed small shells and the skeletons of hydroids. The eggs are small, which implies this species has echinopluteus larvae which are planktonic.

Ecology
A deepwater video survey of the seabed over the Cape Fear coral mound off  North Carolina found the sea urchins E. tylodes and the rather similar Echinus gracilis associated with squat lobsters (Eumunida picta) and spider crabs (Rochinia crassa). These were living among the living and dead remains of the coldwater coral (Lophelia pertusa) from which the mound was largely formed. Other invertebrates present included the deepwater starfish (Novodinia antillensis) and the flytrap anemone (Actinoscyphia saginata). The commonest fish species were the alfonsino (Beryx decadactylus), codlings (Laemonema spp.) and the conger eel (Conger oceanicus).

References

tylodes
Animals described in 1912
Taxa named by Hubert Lyman Clark